Sromowce Wyżne  is a village in the administrative district of Gmina Czorsztyn, within Nowy Targ County, Lesser Poland Voivodeship, in southern Poland, close to the border with Slovakia.

The village has a population of 1,100.

See also
Trzy Korony massif

References

Villages in Nowy Targ County